Paul Anderson (born 1959) is a British journalist and academic, chiefly known as the editor of several political journals.

Educated at Balliol College, Oxford, and the London College of Printing, Anderson was deputy editor of European Nuclear Disarmament Journal (1984–87), reviews editor of Tribune (1986–1991), editor of Tribune (1991–93), and deputy editor of the New Statesman (1993–96), news editor of Red Pepper (1997–99) and deputy editor of the New Times (1999–2000). Since 1999 Anderson has worked as a contract subeditor on a number of publications, including The Guardian.

Anderson is co-author with Nyta Mann of Safety First: The Making of New Labour (1997), an analysis of how the changes made by Neil Kinnock to Labour Party policies led to the development of New Labour under Tony Blair and Gordon Brown.  In a review in The Guardian the Labour MP Roy Hattersley praised Safety First for its detailed coverage of such issues as John Prescott's transformation of ministerial governing, and the Party's "Euro- keynesianism," calling it the "best" book on New Labour. 
Anderson is also editor of Orwell in Tribune: "As I Please" and Other Writings (2006).

Anderson taught journalism at City University, London from 2000 to 2011 and subsequently at the University of Essex.

Bibliography

References

External links
 Paul Anderson archive website
 Paul Anderson's weblog, Gauche

British newspaper editors
British bloggers
Academics of City, University of London
Academics of the University of Essex
1959 births
Living people
Alumni of Balliol College, Oxford
Alumni of the London College of Communication